2017 FC Tokyo season.

J1 League

League table

Matches

References

External links
 J.League official site

FC Tokyo
FC Tokyo seasons